Charles Bukowski is an American poet, novelist and short story writer.

Bukowski may also refer to:

 Bukowski (surname)
 Bukowski (film), a 1973 documentary film on Charles Bukowski by director Taylor Hackford
 Bukowski (band), French musical group
 "Bukowski", a song by Modest Mouse from the album Good News for People Who Love Bad News
 Bukowskis, an auction house
 "Bukowski", a song by Moose Blood off the album, I'll Keep You in Mind, from Time to Time
 Bukowski Demo (Summer '12), demo album by Moose Blood
 Bukowski Design, company specialising in the design, manufacture, marketing and sale of teddybears and other stuffed animals
 Bukowski Las, village in Lublin Voivodeship, in eastern Poland